Hasora badra, the common awl, is a butterfly belonging to the family Hesperiidae, which is found in India.

Description

The butterfly, which has a wingspan of 50 to 55 mm, is unmarked dark brown above. It resembles the common banded awl (Hasora chromus), except that it has no white band below; and the apex of the forewing and the disc of the hindwing below are purple washed. The male has apical spots but no brands above. The female has large yellow spots in cell 2 and 3, and apical dots.

The Sri Lankan race has no apical spots on the male above and no purple wash below.

Detailed description
Edward Yerbury Watson (1891) gives a detailed description, shown below:

Range
The butterfly is found in Sri Lanka, India, Myanmar, Thailand, Laos, Hainan, Taiwan, north Vietnam, Japan, western China, Malaysia, the Indonesian archipelago (Borneo, Sumatra, and Java), the Philippines, Palawan, the Moluccas and Sulawesi.

In India the butterfly is found in South India, where it occurs in the Western Ghats, and the Nilgiris; and in the Himalayas from Mussoorie eastwards to Sikkim and through to Myanmar. It is also found in the Andaman and Nicobar islands.

The type locality is Java, Indonesia.

Status
William Harry Evans (1932) described it as not rare.

Host plants
The larva has been recorded on Derris trifoliata, Derris elliptica, Millettia pachycarpa and Pongamia species.

Cited references

References
Print

Watson, E. Y. (1891) Hesperiidae indicae. Vest and Co. Madras.

Online

Brower, Andrew V. Z., (2007). Hasora Moore 1881. Version 21 February 2007 (under construction). Page on genus Hasora in The Tree of Life Web Project http://tolweb.org/.

Hasora
Butterflies of Asia
Butterflies of Singapore
Butterflies described in 1857